Ravnedalen  may refer to:

 Ravnedalen, Kristiansand is a park in Kristiansand, Norway
 Ravnedalen on the island Bornholm, Denmark